The Suha is a right tributary of the river Moldova in Romania. It discharges into the Moldova in Frasin. It flows through the villages Ostra, Tărnicioara, Stulpicani, Plutonița, Doroteia and the town Frasin.

Tributaries

The following rivers are tributaries to the river Suha:

Left: Brăteasa, Botușan, Muncel, Gemenea, Ursoaia, Valea Seacă
Right: Negrileasa, Braniștea

References

Rivers of Romania
Rivers of Suceava County